John Alfred Gordon Baird (14 January 1924 – 1999) was an English professional footballer who played in the Football League for Mansfield Town.

References

1924 births
1999 deaths
English footballers
Association football midfielders
English Football League players
Ashfield United F.C. players
Mansfield Town F.C. players